Other Voices is the fourth studio album by English singer Paul Young. Released in June 1990, the album peaked at No. 4 on the UK Albums Chart and has been certified gold by the British Phonographic Industry for UK sales in excess of 100,000 copies.

The album contains four UK singles: "Softly Whispering I Love You" (UK #21), "Heaven Can Wait" (UK #71), "Calling You" (UK #57), and a cover of the Chi-Lites' hit "Oh Girl" (UK #25, U.S. #8).

The album followed the pattern of Young's first three albums combining cover versions with original songs. However, with the songwriting partnership of Young and keyboard player Ian Kewley breaking up, this album returned to the dominance of cover versions seen on Young's debut No Parlez. However, there were three original songs composed by Young with new keyboard player Martin Page.

Track listing 
"Heaven Can Wait" (Paul Rutter) – 4:11
"A Little Bit of Love" (Paul Rodgers, Andy Fraser, Paul Kossoff, Simon Kirke) – 3:50
"Softly Whispering I Love You" (Roger Cook, Roger Greenaway) – 4:13
"Together" (Paul Young, Martin Page) – 4:33
"Stop on By" (Bobby Womack, Terry Thomas) – 5:21
"Our Time Has Come" (Paul Young, Martin Page) – 4:38
"Oh Girl" (Eugene Record) – 3:33
"Right About Now" (Paul Young, Martin Page) – 5:10
"It's What She Didn't Say" (Peter Wolf, Ina Wolf) – 5:02
"Calling You" (Bob Telson) – 5:08

Personnel 
 Paul Young – lead vocals, acoustic guitar (3), backing vocals (6)
 Richard Cottle – keyboards (1, 5), Hammond organ (3)
 Paul Wickens – acoustic piano (1, 3, 4, 8), organ (1), Hammond organ (4)
 Richard Hilton – programming (2)
 Nile Rodgers – programming (2), guitars (2)
 Warne Livesey – synthesizers (3), synthesizer programming (3), acoustic guitar (3), keyboards (4, 8), programming (4), bass (8)
 Steve Winwood – Hammond organ (5)
 Martin Page – keyboards (6, 8), percussion (6), backing vocals (6), additional guitar (8), bass (8)
 Larry Williams – keyboards (6), programming (6), saxophone (6)
 Pete Wingfield – acoustic piano (7)
 Peter Wolf – keyboards (9, 10)
 Steve Bolton – guitar (1)
 David Gilmour – lead guitar (1), guitar solo (2)
 Robbie McIntosh – electric guitar (3), guitars (4)
 Dominic Miller – nylon guitar (3), guitars (8)
 Neil Hubbard – guitars (5)
 Dann Huff – guitars (6)
 Robert Ahwai – guitars (7)
 David Williams – guitars (9)
 Dori Caymmi – guitars (10), backing vocals (10)
 Pino Palladino – bass (1, 3, 4, 5, 9, 10)
 Julian Crampton – bass (7)
 Neil Conti – drums (1)
 Andres Levin – drum samples (2)
 Manu Katché – drums (3, 4, 5, 8)
 Vinnie Colaiuta – drums (6, 9, 10)
 Graham Ward – drums (7)
 Danny Cummings – percussion (4, 5)
 Anne Dudley – strings (3, 7)
 Guy Barker – flugelhorn (4)
 Stevie Wonder – harmonica solo (7, 10)
 Chaka Khan – harmony vocals (1, 5)
 Jimmy Chambers – backing vocals (1, 3, 4, 7)
 George Chandler – backing vocals (1, 3, 4, 7)
 Ava Cherry – backing vocals (1, 8)
 Belva Haney – backing vocals (1, 8)
 Jimmy Helms – backing vocals (1, 3, 4, 7)
 Beverley Skeete – backing vocals (1, 8)
 Michelle Cobbs – backing vocals (2)
 Lamya – backing vocals (2)
 Fonzi Thornton – backing vocals (2)
 Robert Carr – backing vocals (3)
 Paul Lee – backing vocals (3)
 Merlin Sutherland – backing vocals (3)
 Carol Thompson – backing vocals (3)
 Joan Todd – backing vocals (3)
 Liliana Chachian – Spanish chorus (4)
 Carlos Fuentes – Spanish chorus (4)
 Tommy Funderburk – backing vocals (6)
 Joe Pizzulo – backing vocals (6, 9)
 Phyllis St. James – backing vocals (6)
 Phillip Ingram – backing vocals (9)
 Darryl Phinnessee – backing vocals (9)
 Oren Waters – backing vocals (9)
 Ina Wolf – backing vocals (9)

Production 
 Paul Young – executive producer 
 Wayne Livesey – producer (1, 3, 4, 5, 8)
 Nile Rodgers – producer (2)
 Martin Page – producer (6)
 Pete Wingfield – producer (7)
 Peter Wolf – producer (9, 10)
 Patrick Dillett – engineer 
 Bino Espinoza – engineer, mixing (9)
 Ted Hayton – engineer 
 Steve Jackson – engineer 
 Joe Scott – recording 
 Mark Chamberlain – overdub recording 
 Mike Ross-Trevor – strings engineer (3, 7)
 Bob Clearmountain – mixing (1, 3, 7)
 Michael H. Brauer – mixing (2, 4, 5, 6, 8)
 Paul Erickson – mixing (10)
 Stylorouge – art direction, design 
 Douglas Brothers – photography 
 Ged Doherty – management

Charts and certifications

Weekly charts

Certifications

References

1990 albums
Paul Young albums
Albums produced by Nile Rodgers
Columbia Records albums